West Virginia's 1st Senate district is one of 17 districts in the West Virginia Senate. It is currently represented by Republican Ryan Weld and Republican Laura Wakim Chapman . All districts in the West Virginia Senate elect two members to staggered four-year terms.

Geography
District 1 is based in the Northern Panhandle, covering all of Brooke, Hancock, and Ohio Counties and parts of Marshall County. It includes the communities of Wheeling, Chester, New Cumberland, Weirton, Follansbee, Wellsburg, West Liberty, and Bethlehem.

The district is located entirely within West Virginia's 2nd congressional district, and overlaps with all or part of the 1st through 7th districts of the West Virginia House of Delegates. It borders the states of Ohio and Pennsylvania.

Recent election results

2022

Historical election results

2020

2018

2016

2014

2012

Federal and statewide results in District 1

References

1
Brooke County, West Virginia
Hancock County, West Virginia
Marshall County, West Virginia
Ohio County, West Virginia